Liam Corcoran (born July 3, 1984) is a Canadian singer-songwriter based in Charlottetown, Prince Edward Island. Formerly the front-man of Two Hours Traffic, he is now an established solo artist.

Career

Two Hours Traffic 
Two Hours Traffic was a Canadian indie rock band active from 2000 to 2013. Hailing from Charlottetown, Prince Edward Island, the group were performers of power-pop songs. Core members included Liam Corcoran (lead vocals, guitar), Alec O’Hanley (lead guitar, vocals, keyboards), Andrew MacDonald (bass, lead guitar), and Derek Ellis (drums), with Nathan Gill (bass) replacing O’Hanley in 2011. Their fourth album, Little Jabs, was short-listed for the Polaris Music Prize. The band held a farewell tour before disbanding in 2013. Since then, the group has reunited occasionally.

Each of the band members has since moved on to other musical projects: Corcoran pursues a solo career and plays with The Express; O’Hanley is part of Alvvays; Gill is part of North Lakes and Baby God; and MacDonald and Ellis are part of Golden Cinema.

The Express 
The Express is a side project of cousins Liam Corcoran and former Hey Rosetta! member Kinley Dowling. Beginning in 2010, the duo began as an outlet for the artists to explore their songwriting. During this time, Corcoran developed a different compositional voice while Dowling started songwriting. The group is described as both folk and pop, with their debut self-titled album being heavily acousticー Dowling wrote three tracks while Corcoran wrote the rest. The album explores transitions, honesty, youth, new relationships, and experiences, while Corcoran's acoustic guitar and Dowling's violin and viola (even plucked like a mandolin in her track "Sharpshooter") serve as bedrocks. Cuff the Duke member Dale Murray is featured much in this work, not only producing (with "spontaneity over rigid structure"), but also playing frequently. He is sometimes cited as a core member of the Express in his own right. The self-titled album was described by the Graypoint Owl as "one part Two Hours Traffic catchiness, one part Hey Rosetta! sensitivity and one part Cuff the Duke earthiness", receiving the rating of "Proud Hoot (Really Good) + *swoop*".

After this release, the Express went on hiatus as Corcoran and Dowling established their solo careers, but as of February 2020 the group has reconnected and performed.

Solo career 
Following his ensemble experiences with Two Hours Traffic and The Express, Corcoran has developed his career as a solo artist. Although his material continues to exhibit the catchiness of pop, it has grown in other different directions. His debut EP Rom-Drom can be neatly categorized as alt-country, but Nevahland, his first LP, is a stylistically-complex blend of rock, pop, indie, hip-hop, and alt-country. In March 2020, Corcoran released his latest album, Giving Tree and Other Songs ー an album split into two parts: simple acoustic songs and more elaborately-orchestrated songs, each with their own flavour including punk, rock, alt-country, lo-fi, and indie-pop. His first two releases also feature extra-musical themes: Rom-Drom explores separation from a distance, and Nevahland tells the story of three couples fleeing an oncoming disaster.

Personal life 
Liam Corcoran works as the Program Manager for Holland College’s School of Performing Arts (SOPA). He has also worked in other branches of education, notably co-writing a song with students from Prince Street Elementary School. In recent years, Corcoran has become a father and husband; this is encapsulated in his album Giving Tree and Other Songs which reflects ideas of domesticity and fatherhood. Corcoran is a cousin of songwriter and former Hey Rosetta! member Kinley Dowling.

Discography

Two Hours Traffic 

 2003: The April Storm (EP)
 2005: Two Hours Traffic
 2006: Isolator (EP)
 2007: Little Jabs
 2009: Territory
 2012: Siren Spell (EP)
 2013: Foolish Blood

The Express 

 2011: The Express

Solo releases 

 2015: Rom-Drom (EP)
 2017: Nevahland
 2020: Giving Tree and Other Songs

References

External links 
Official Facebook page of Liam Corcoran

Musicians from Charlottetown
1984 births
Living people
21st-century Canadian male singers